Bansko is a town in southwestern Bulgaria, located at the foot of the Pirin Mountains at an elevation of 925 above sea level. It is a ski resort.

Legends
There are several legends about who founded Bansko. According to one, Bansko was founded by people who lived in Dobarsko, a village in Rila, itself, according to a legend, founded by the blinded army of Tsar Samuil. Another legend claims that Bansko was founded by an Italian painter by the name of Ciociolino, hence the existence of the name Chucholin in Bansko.

Still according to another version it was a Slavic tribe called the Peruns, who lived in Pirin and worshiped Perun, that founded the village later to become a town. There are a number of ethnographic texts, legends, prayers and oratories, which lend credence to this legend.

History
Archeological traces of the inhabitants of Bansko and the Razlog Valley in general date to the early times of the Roman Empire. There are several housing structures at the outskirts of the town, which date to 100 BC. However, there is no consensus nor credible theory on who these people were.

Bansko, then part of the Byzantine (Eastern Roman) Empire was annexed to Bulgaria during the reign of Knyaz Krum, probably around 811 AD, and passed back and forth between Byzantines and Bulgarians for the next few centuries, before falling under Ottoman rule in the 14th century.

Remains of an antique medieval church were found 2 kilometers southwest of the town, in the Shipotsko locality. It was built in the late 4th or early 5th century, probably on an earlier Thracian structure, with a necropolis with over 150 graves around it. The ancient church was destroyed in the 6th century, rebuilt after the 12th century and again destroyed by the Ottomans.

In the 18th-19th centuries Bansko maintained good relations with the Rila Monastery; there is a myth in the village about a priest, Joseph the Builder. Bansko pilgrimage groups donate generously to the monastery (in 1840 they received 4310 groschen). Molerov's Bansko painters are known for their murals in the church and chapels of the monastery and for its icons. Bansko supplies food to the priests' brotherhood - beans, soap, olive oil, etc. In 1852 the Banskali Todor erected an iron statue, as a gift for the monastery in the village of Rila.

Around 1850, the Bansko Municipality was founded - an organization of local Bulgarian self-government, a continuation of the general village council formed in 1833, headed by Lazar German, to provide funds, materials and manpower for the construction and decoration of the Holy Trinity Church, consecrated in 1835. The municipality's leadership includes influential representatives of the trade and craft industry. In the 1860s and 1870s the municipality headed the struggle against the Greek ecclesiastical authorities, for the independence of the Bulgarian church and for the development of enlightenment in the village. At its initiative, a new school building was built in 1857, the mutual school was reorganized into classrooms, and the Revival newspapers and books were distributed. The municipality organized the construction of a bell tower for the Holy Trinity Church in 1850 and the installation of a clock in 1865.

According to testimonies of American missionaries who visited Bansko in 1867, there were 4 to 5 thousand inhabitants who welcome them. In the 1970s, together with other municipalities in Razlog, they all resisted the Protestant propaganda. The Bansko Bulgarian Municipality financially supports the families affected by the suppression of the Kresna-Razlog Uprising of 1878-1879 and the Ilinden-Transfiguration Uprising of 1903.

In the Ethnography of the Villanets of Adrianople, Monastir and Thessaloniki, published in Constantinople in 1878 and reflecting statistics of the male population of 1873, Bansko is cited as a village with 798 households and 2,700 Bulgarians.

Georgi Strezov wrote about Bansko in 1891:

"Bansko, a palace larger than Mehomiya, only 1 hour far away. The road is flat and wide. Bansko is situated on a hill and has a good look, better than Mehomiya. There are 5 inns in Bansko. Water is plentiful here, almost every street has a stream or a fountain. Most of the houses are built of stone and have two storeys. In the middle of the village stands a beautiful church of the Holy Trinity with a bell-shaped bell-tower. There is also a city clock made by a self-made engineer and machinist, T.H. Radonov. The boys' school is not far away from the church: a new huge building that could house up to a thousand students; the yard is wide. There are 6 teachers with 300 students; the girls' school is a little further, with 2 teachers and up to 150 students. By 1887, the two schools were united, then they first separated and formed grades I and II during the times of teachers Samardzhiev and Boyanov. Protestants, about 50 houses, have their own school and prayer house."

"The main occupation of the inhabitants is agriculture. The tobacco tablecloth, which was once in good condition, now seats 50 people in 3 tabakhans. There are all kinds of other craftsmen also. Remarkable are the gigantic growth, the rugged structure, the ruddy appearance and the innate wit of the inhabitants. Many without any knowledge have built wool factories, spinning machines, etc. Carpenters are no less skilled. By its mild nature, the Banskali are distinguished from others; the same difference is observed in speech. In Bansko and Belitsa there are rumors about people who are specifically involved in making money; this craft was old in the place. Note that there are many skillful hardware artisans' stores. Carpentry is quite advanced: coffins, chairs and more. Their products are distributed all over Macedonia and Bulgaria. Besides the up-mentioned church, there is another old one near the cemetery. There are 1200 houses, all of which are inhabited by Bulgarians."

According to the statistician Vasil Kunchov (Macedonia, Ethnography and Statistics), Bansko is the largest settlement in Razlog, as of 1900. It is home to 6,500 Bulgarian Christians.

At the outbreak of the Balkan War in 1912, 131 people from Bansko volunteered in the Macedonian-Adrian militia. During the war, the municipality organized gathering of food and clothing for the Bulgarian army and for the volunteers' troops of the IMORO. Bansko was released on October 5, 1912, with the help of forces led by Yonko Vaptsarov, Hristo Chernopeev, Georgi Zankov, Mikhail Chakov, Peyo Yavorov, Stefan Chavdarov, Lazar Kolchagov and others. Two days later, voivode Peyo Yavorov congratulated the Banskali on being free

Religion 

The church "Sveta Troitsa" (Holy Trinity) is an Orthodox Christian church, part of Bulgarian Orthodox Church. It was built by the people of Bansko in 1835.

The Bulgarian Evangelical Church Community, the first Protestant church in Bulgaria, was founded in Bansko on 6 August 1868.

Economy

Bansko, once mainly a stockbreeding and travelling merchant community, has become an international centre for winter and summer tourism. The mountain peaks near the town, the numerous lakes and the old pine woods make it a recreation destination. Bulgaria's share in European winter tourism is steadily rising, and Bansko increasingly competes with resorts in France and Switzerland due to the comparatively lower costs.
Improvements to the infrastructure and organisation of the ski area on Todorka have been made annually to accommodate the rising number of tourists. A gondola lift was built from town in 2003, replacing the minibus ride to the primary base area of Banderishka Poliana. , the ski area has  of ski runs, 14 lifts and drags, serving up to 24,500 persons per hour.

Nowadays Bansko is known as a destination for Digital nomads. Coworking Bansko is a community of Digital Nomads that has two co-working locations in the north and south part of the town.

The nearby village of Banya, located only  from the town, is known for its 27 thermal mineral springs.

The town is served by the scenic narrow gauge line from Septemvri to Dobrinishte. Regular bus connections are available to Sofia, Plovdiv, Blagoevgrad, Gotse Delchev, Razlog, among others.

Many of the infrastructure problems have been given attention to since 2009. The large portion of unfinished apartments are now being given attention as well. Due to the global recovery from the financial crisis and the more realistic pricing, apartments are attracting more buyers from across Europe. In 2010 the resort recovered from the crisis and has seen record profits.

Climate

Historical climate data

Sports
Bansko has recently hosted FIS World Cup alpine ski races: the women raced in 2009 in two downhills and a super-G. The men's circuit made its first stop at Bansko in 2011 with a super combined and a slalom. It hosted the men's giant slalom in February 2012 and the FIS World Cup ladies' downhill and super G, and men's giant slalom and slalom.

Alpine and biathlon competitions take place regularly. It is expected that the summer biathlon world cup will also take place in the resort of Bansko.

Events
The town is the location for an annual jazz event, the Bansko Jazz Festival, and also the annual Bansko pop-star concert. In March, the town hosts the British underground dance fete Horizon Festival.

Honours
Bansko Peak on Livingston Island in the South Shetland Islands, Antarctica is named after the town of Bansko.

International relations

Twin towns – sister cities
Bansko is twinned with:

  Amphipolis, Greece
  Didymoteicho, Greece
  Doxato, Greece
  Zakopane, Poland

Notable people 
Notable people that were born or lived in Bansko include:
 Paisius of Hilendar (1722-1773), author of Istoriya Slavyanobolgarskaya
 Neofit Rilski (1793-1881), monk, teacher and artist
 Nikola Vaptsarov (1909-1942), poet and revolutionary
 Irina Nikulchina (born 1974), 2002 Winter Olympics bronze medal winner

See also 
 List of cities and towns in Bulgaria

References

External links
 
 
 Information about Bansko, ski slopes, lift passes, webcams
 Ski world cup Bansko 2012
 Culinary tourism in Bansko-Razlog area
 International jazz festival
 Tourist information
 Mountaineer film festival

Ski areas and resorts in Bulgaria
Tourist attractions in Blagoevgrad Province
Bansko